Johnny Restivo is a former American rock and roll vocalist.

Restivo was born in The Bronx and released a single with RCA Victor when he was only fifteen years old. That single, "The Shape I'm In/Ya Ya", reached #80 on the Billboard Hot 100. Restivo was nominated for a Grammy Award for Best New Artist, but lost to Bobby Darin. Restivo never charted another hit. Johnny also achieved fame as a muscular young bodybuilder while in his teens. He was on the covers of the magazines Tomorrow's Man and Model Parade.

"The Shape I'm In", written by Lee Cathy and Otis Blackwell, was covered by Dave Edmunds (on Information),  Shakin' Stevens (on Lipstick, Powder and Paint) and The Black Sorrows (single from Rockin' Zydeco).

Discography
The Shape I'm In (RCA Victor, 1959)
Oh Johnny! (RCA Victor, 1959)
"Smarty" (CBS, 1967)
"Go, Go, Eskimo!" (CBS 1967)

References

External links
Johnny Restivo at rockabilly.nl

Living people
American male singers
1943 births
Singers from New York City
People from the Bronx